Tamreswari temple (also Dikkaravasini, Kesai Khati) is situated about 18 km away from Sadiya in Tinsukia district, Assam, India. The temple was in the custody of non-Brahmin tribal priests called Deoris. Some remains suggest that a Chutiya king built a wall in the year 1442. The temple was dedicated to Kechaikhati (kechai means raw and khati means eat), a powerful tribal deity or a form of the Buddhist deity Tara,  commonly found among different Bodo-Kachari groups.
The worship of the goddess even after coming under Hindu influence was performed according to her old tribal customs. The temple was abandoned during the reign of Suhitpangphaa (1780 - 1795), when the Ahom kingdom was attacked by the Konbaung dynasty of Burma. Scholars assert that Kesaikhaiti is equivalent to the Tai-Khamti female deity Nang Hoo Toungh.

Stone inscription

The stone inscription found in the temple reads:

The inscription describes that the walls of the temple have been built using bricks (Ichtaka) by the son Mukta Dharmanarayan of the old king (name not specified) in the Saka year 1364 (1442 AD).

The name Tamresari
The wall and doors of the temple were well designed with beautiful works. There were two giant elephant sculptures with silver tusks at the main door. The walls were made without any mortar. The temple roof was made of copper, that's why it is called Tamreswari. The whole temple was surrounded with brick walls and on the western wall there was a place for human sacrifice.

Architecture
The roof of the Tamresari temple was originally sheeted with copper as mentioned in the Changrung Phukan Buranji (1711 AD), from which the name is derived. In 1848, when Dalton visited the site, he found a stone structure, but the copper roof was already removed. As per T.Block who visited the site in 1905, this square structure in the corner cannot have been the main building inside the complex and the brick wall evidently enclosed some sort of a grand temple in the center which has disappeared with time.  According to S.F. Hannay, the present temple complex was as near as possible square with the doorway to the west. There was a substantial brick wall, about 4.5 feet thick rising to the height of 8 feet, on the foundation of rudely cut blocks of sandstone. The entrance of the complex was on the west face, where there had been a stone enclosure and door. The ruins of the gateway which remains include the lintel carved on the edge in a chain of lotus flowers, some ornamented small pillars and an elephant statue. The three blocks forming the doorway, each of 7.5 feet long and 2 feet by 18 inches in girth, along with the blocks of the projecting wall, were reddish porphyritic granite of an adamantine hardness. There was another stone gateway at the southeast corner leading to the stream, in the bed of which are several carved and plain blocks of granite and sandstone. According to Debala Mitra(1956), the temple was originally Chaturayatana, i.e. having four shrines, built of sandstone and granite and located in the south-east section of the rectangular brick enclosure, prakara roughly measuring 208 ft by 130 ft. The compound wall was 4 feet wide and 8 feet tall and had a stone gateway on the eastern side.  In the floods of 1959, due to deposit of silt in the banks of Paya river the structure was completely submerged in the waters.

Notes

References

External links

Tinsukia district
Culture of Assam
Temples in India
Religious buildings and structures in Assam